A wind erosion equation is an equation used to design wind erosion control systems, which considers soil erodibility, soil roughness, climate, the unsheltered distance across a field, and the vegetative cover on the ground.

References

Geomorphology